Oum Zebed (also known as Oum ez Zebed el djadida ) is a village in the commune of M'Naguer, in Taibet District, Ouargla Province, Algeria.

population  
people of oum zebed belong to Arch "Ouled Sayah" (Arch means clan ),named after the ancestor of these people and many others in the region nearby, who is Sidi Mohammed Sayah originally from telemcen city, he was called sayah which means " voyager " because of his journeys from telemcen towards many placese,

References

Neighbouring towns and cities

Populated places in Ouargla Province